This is a timeline documenting the events of heavy metal music in the year 1994.

Newly formed bands
 20 Dead Flower Children
36 Crazyfists
Abaddon Incarnate
 Abscess
Abstrakt Algebra
The Abyss
Agoraphobic Nosebleed
 Amen
Antaeus
Aurora Borealis
Behexen
Blindside
Blut Aus Nord
Coalesce
Colour Haze
Corrupted 
Craft  
Creed   
Dark Fortress  
Deadguy
 Deströyer 666
DGM
Disillusion 
Dismal Euphony
 Disturbed (as Brawl)
 Dødheimsgard
 Draconian
 Edguy
Ektomorf
Empyrium
Epoch Of Unlight
Eternal Tears of Sorrow
 Evoken
Flowing Tears
Gluecifer
Gov't Mule
 Graveworm
Gravity Kills
Guano Apes
 HammerFall
 Hatebreed
 Heavenly
Hed PE
The Hellacopters
Hollenthon
Horde
Iron Monkey 
Kalisia 
Kampfar
Knut 
Kobong 
Kronos  
 Lacuna Coil
Lake of Tears
 Lamb of God (as Burn the Priest)
 Limbonic Art
Limp Bizkit
 Lost Horizon
Lux Occulta
Martyr 
 Melechesh
Mob Rules
 Moonspell
 Muse
 Mushroomhead
 Naer Mataron
Nailbomb
 Necrophagist
Negură Bunget
 Neuraxis
Nightingale 
 Nile
 Nothingface
October Tide
Officium Triste
O.N.A.
Page and Plant
Portal 
 Primordial
 Quo Vadis
Ragnarok 
 Rammstein
 Scarve
 Sevendust
Siebenbürgen
 Six Feet Under
 Skylark
 Slash's Snakepit
Spiritual Beggars
 Static-X
 Strapping Young Lad
 Stone Sour
Suidakra
 Symphony X
 System of a Down
Tenacious D
 Theatre of Tragedy
Theatres des Vampires
Throes of Dawn
Thyrane
Trail of Tears 
 Ulver
 Vintersorg
 Virgin Black
Windir

Albums

 Accept – Death Row
 Acid Bath – When the Kite String Pops
 Acid King – Acid King (EP)
 Alice Cooper – The Last Temptation
 Alice in Chains – Jar of Flies
 Aggressor – Of Long Duration Anguish
 The Almighty – Crank
 Altar - Youth Against Christ
 Amorphis – Tales from the Thousand Lakes
 Ancient – Svartalvheim
 Annihilator – King of the Kill
 Arcturus – Constellation (EP)
 Asphyx - Asphyx
 At the Gates - Terminal Spirit Disease
 Bang Tango – Love After Death
 Bathory – Requiem
 Behemoth – And the Forests Dream Eternally (EP)
 Benediction - The Grotesque / Ashen Epitaph (EP)
 Bestial Warlust - Vengeance War Till Death
 Biohazard – State of the World Address
 Black Sabbath – Cross Purposes
 The Black Crowes – Amorica
 Body Count – Born Dead
 Bolt Thrower – ...For Victory
 Bon Jovi – Cross Road
 Bruce Dickinson – Balls to Picasso
 Brutality - When the Sky Turns Black
 Brutal Truth - Need to Control
 Burzum – Hvis lyset tar oss
 Cannibal Corpse – The Bleeding
 Cathedral – Cosmic Requiem (EP)
 Cathedral – In Memorium (EP)
 Cathedral – Statik Majik (EP)
 Cemetary – Black Vanity
 Cinderella – Still Climbing
 Converge – Halo in a Haystack
 Corrosion of Conformity – Deliverance
 Cradle of Filth – The Principle of Evil Made Flesh
 Cryptopsy – Blasphemy Made Flesh
 The Cult – The Cult
 Dangerous Toys – Pissed
 Danzig – Danzig 4
 Dark Funeral – Dark Funeral (EP)
 Darkthrone – Transilvanian Hunger
 Deliverance – River Disturbance
 Destruction – Destruction (EP)
 Desultory - Bitterness
 Dio – Strange Highways (US release)
 DGeneration – DGeneration
 Downset. – downset.
 Dream Theater – Awake
 Edge of Sanity – Purgatory Afterglow
 Electric Wizard – Electric Wizard
 Emperor – In the Nightside Eclipse
 Enslaved – Frost
 Enslaved – Vikingligr Veldi
 Fates Warning – Inside Out
 Freak Kitchen – Appetizer
 Forbidden – Distortion
 Fu Manchu – No One Rides for Free
 Gehenna – First Spell (EP)
 Gilby Clarke – Pawnshop Guitars
 Godflesh – Selfless
 Gorefest – Erase
 Gorgoroth – Pentagram
 Gotthard – Dial Hard
 Grave - Soulless
 Gwar – This Toilet Earth 
 Helloween – Master of the Rings
 Helmet – Betty
 Hypocrisy – The Fourth Dimension
 Impaled Nazarene – Suomi Finland Perkele
 In Flames – Lunar Strain
 Incantation – Mortal Throne of Nazarene
 Infectious Grooves – Groove Family Cyco
 Killing Joke – Pandemonium
 King's X – Dogman
 Korn – Korn
 Korpse - Pull the Flood
 Kyuss – Welcome to Sky Valley
 L.A. Guns – Vicious Circle
 Lake of Tears – Greater Art
 Love/Hate – Lets Rumble
 Luciferion - Demonication (The Manifest)
 Tony MacAlpine – Premonition
 Machine Head – Burn My Eyes
 Madball – Set It Off
 Magnum – Rock Art
 Yngwie Malmsteen – The Seventh Sign
 Manic Eden – Manic Eden
 Marduk – Opus Nocturne
 Marilyn Manson – Portrait of an American Family
 Mayhem – De Mysteriis Dom Sathanas
 Megadeth – Youthanasia
 Melvins – Stoner Witch
 Memento Mori – Life, Death, and Other Morbid Tales
 Mercyful Fate – Time
 Meshuggah – None (EP)
 Moonspell – Under the Moonspell (EP)
 Mortification - Blood World
 Mötley Crüe – Mötley Crüe
 My Dying Bride - I Am the Bloody Earth (EP)
 Nailbomb – Point Blank
 Napalm Death – Fear, Emptiness, Despair
 The New York Dolls – Rock'n Roll
 Nine Inch Nails – The Downward Spiral
 Nirvana – MTV Unplugged in New York
 No One Is Innocent – No One Is Innocent
 Occult – Prepare to Meet Thy Doom
 Obituary – World Demise
 The Obsessed – The Church Within
 Oomph! – Sperm
 Overkill – W.F.O.
 Pantera – Far Beyond Driven
 Pearl Jam – Vitalogy
 Pentagram - Be Forewarned
 Pitchshifter – The Remix War (remix)
 Pride & Glory – Pride & Glory
 Pro-Pain – The Truth Hurts
 Prong – Cleansing
 Pungent Stench - Club Mondo Bizarre – For Members Only
 P.O.D. – Snuff the Punk
 Queensrÿche – Promised Land
 Rage – 10 Years in Rage (compilation)
 Ram Jam – Nouvel Album (also released under the name Thank You Mam in 1995)
 Rollins Band – Weight
 Ron Wasserman – Mighty Morphin Power Rangers the Album: A Rock Adventure (soundtrack)
 Rotting Christ – Non Serviam
 Running Wild – Black Hand Inn
 Samael – Ceremony of Opposites
 Satyricon – The Shadowthrone
 Savatage – Handful of Rain
 Senser – Stacked Up
 Sentenced - The Trooper (EP)
 Septicflesh - Mystic Places of Dawn
 Skyclad – Prince of the Poverty Line
 Slayer – Divine Intervention
 Sodom – Get What You Deserve
 Solitude Aeturnus – Through the Darkest Hour
 Solstice – Lamentations
 Soundgarden – Superunknown
 Stabbing Westward – Ungod
 Stone Temple Pilots – Purple
 Stratovarius – Dreamspace
 Suicidal Tendencies – Suicidal for Life
 Symphony X – Symphony X
 Tankard – Two-Faced
 Testament – Low
 Therapy? – Troublegum
 Threshold – Psychedelicatessen
 The 3rd and the Mortal – Sorrow (EP)
 The 3rd and the Mortal – Tears Laid in Earth
 Tiamat – Wildhoney
 Tuff – Fist First
 Urban Dance Squad – Persona Non Grata
 Vader – Sothis (EP)
 Vanden Plas – Colour Temple
 Various Artists – Nativity in Black (Black Sabbath tribute album)
 Vicious Rumors – Word of Mouth
 Whitesnake – Greatest Hits
 Widowmaker – Stand by for Pain

Disbandments
Atheist (reformed in 2006)
Follow for Now 
Lost Horizon (then known as Highlander) (reformed in 1999)
Metal Church (reformed in 1998)
Nirvana

Events
 Korn release their critically acclaimed self-titled debut album, which is generally considered the first ever "nu metal" album.
 Divine Intervention by Slayer peaks at Number 8 on the U.S. Billboard 200 chart, with 93,000 copies sold in its first week, and later that year was certified gold in Canada and United States.
 Nicholas Barker becomes the drummer for Cradle of Filth.
 Longtime Extreme drummer Paul Geary leaves the band is replaced by Michael Mangini.
 Testament release their sixth album Low. It is their first album recorded without original guitarist Alex Skolnick and drummer Louie Clemente, who both left the band a year before, and also their last with longtime bassist Greg Christian, who left two years later.
 Metallica, Danzig and Suicidal Tendencies embark on a U.S. tour together.
 Oomph! establish the rudiments of the Neue Deutsche Härte genre with their album Sperm.
 Vocalist Ralf Scheepers leaves Gamma Ray. He would later go on to form Primal Fear.

1990s in heavy metal music
Metal